The 1995 NCAA Men's Water Polo Championship was the 27th annual NCAA Men's Water Polo Championship to determine the national champion of NCAA men's collegiate water polo. Tournament matches were played at the Avery Aquatic Center in Stanford, California during December 1995. The tournament field decreased for the first time this year, shrinking from 8 to 4 teams.

UCLA defeated California in the final, 10–8, to win their fourth national title. The Bruins (20–6) were coached by Guy Baker.

The Most Outstanding Players of the tournament were Brent Albright (California), Jeremy Braxton-Brown (UCLA), Matt Swanson (UCLA), and Jim Toring (UCLA). All four, along with five other players, comprised the All-Tournament Team.

The tournament's leading scorer, with 8 goals, was Jeremy Braxton-Brown from UCLA.

Qualification
Since there has only ever been one single national championship for water polo, all NCAA men's water polo programs (whether from Division I, Division II, or Division III) were eligible. A total of 4 teams were invited to contest this championship, a decrease from the 8 teams that had contested every prior championship.

Bracket
Site: Avery Aquatic Center, Stanford, California

All-tournament team 
Brent Albright, California (Most outstanding player)
Jeremy Braxton-Brown, UCLA (Most outstanding player)
Matt Swanson, UCLA (Most outstanding player)
Jim Toring, UCLA (Most outstanding player)
Pat Cochran, California
Nick Kittredge, California
Adam Krikorian, UCLA
Luis Limardo, Massachusetts
Michael Nalu, UC San Diego

See also 
 NCAA Men's Water Polo Championship

References

NCAA Men's Water Polo Championship
NCAA Men's Water Polo Championship
1995 in sports in California
December 1995 sports events in the United States
1995